Georgia competed at the 2012 Winter Youth Olympics in Innsbruck, Austria. The Georgian team consisted of two athletes in one sport, alpine skiing.

Alpine skiing

Georgia qualified one boy and girl in alpine skiing.

Boy

Girl

See also
Georgia at the 2012 Summer Olympics

References

2012 in Georgian sport
Nations at the 2012 Winter Youth Olympics
Georgia (country) at the Youth Olympics